Michael Kenneth Pratt GC (born 15 November 1954) is a former constable of the Victoria Police Force in Melbourne, Australia, who received the George Cross for outstanding bravery in his efforts to thwart the armed robbery of a bank in 1976.

Intervention
On the morning of 4 June 1976, Constable Pratt intervened in a robbery of an ANZ Bank branch in Clifton Hill, and was shot in the back when he tried to stop the robbery. Keith George Faure was convicted for the shooting. The injuries received resulted in Pratt retiring from the Victoria Police Force.

Citation
In 1978 Pratt was awarded the George Cross. The official announcement was published in the London Gazette on 3 July, reading:

Education
Pratt went to school at the Christian Brothers College (Junior School) at Alphington and Bundoora, followed by Preston Technical School, where he captained the Football Club in 1972.

References

1954 births
Living people
Australian recipients of the George Cross
Australian shooting survivors
Police officers from Melbourne
People educated at Parade College